How Death Came to Earth is a 14-minute cutout animation film by Ishu Patel produced in 1971 by the National Film Board of Canada. The film deals with an Indian myth of creation, and is notable for its trippy visual style.

References
Profile on the Internet Movie Database
The National Film Board of Canada

External links 
 

Canadian animated short films
1971 films
National Film Board of Canada animated short films
Films directed by Ishu Patel
Films based on folklore
Cutout animation films
1970s animated short films
1971 animated films
1970s English-language films
1970s Canadian films